Davisite is an exceedingly rare mineral of the pyroxene group, with formula CaScAlSiO6. It is the scandium-dominant member. It stands for scandium-analogue of other pyroxene-group members, esseneite, grossmanite and kushiroite. Davisite is one of scarce minerals containing essential scandium.

Named after Andrew M. Davis, American meteoriticist and professor of astronomy and geoscience at the University of Chicago.

Based on a synthesized sample, the mineral likely crystallizes in the monoclinic crystal system with space group C2/c.

References

Pyroxene group
Inosilicates
Calcium minerals
Scandium minerals
Aluminium minerals
Monoclinic minerals
Minerals in space group 15